Jalilu Haruna Mola (born  2 June 1999) is a Ghanaian footballer who currently plays as a forward for Ghana Premier League side WAFA.

Career 
Mola joined West African Football Academy in January 2020 during the 2019–20 season. On 1 March 2020, in a league match against Ashanti Gold, he was brought on the 90th minute for Richard Danso to make his debut. With his first touch of the ball, he scored his debut goal to help WAFA earn a 6–1 victory. He however featured in only one more match as the season was cut short due to the COVID-19 pandemic in Ghana. The following season, he made the squad list for the season. He made 10 league appearances in the first round of the season, before joining Tema Youth in March 2021.

References

External links 

 
 

Living people
1999 births
Association football forwards
Ghanaian footballers
West African Football Academy players
Ghana Premier League players
Ghanaian expatriate footballers
Ghanaian expatriate sportspeople in Norway
IF Fram Larvik players